Jürgen W. Heike (9 March 1949 – 15 March 2022) was a German politician. A member of the Christian Social Union in Bavaria, he served in the Landtag of Bavaria from 1994 to 2018. He died in Neustadt bei Coburg on 15 March 2022, at the age of 73.

References

1949 births
2022 deaths
Christian Social Union in Bavaria politicians
20th-century German lawyers
Members of the Landtag of Bavaria
University of Erlangen-Nuremberg alumni
People from Coburg (district)